The 2011–12 Texas State Bobcats men's basketball team represented Texas State University during the 2011–12 NCAA Division I men's basketball season. The Bobcats, led by fifth year head coach Doug Davalos, played their home games at the Strahan Coliseum and were members of the West Division of the Southland Conference. They finished the season 13–17, 5–11 in Southland play to finish in fifth place in the Southland West Division. They failed to qualify for the Southland Basketball tournament.

This was the Bobcats final season as members of the Southland Conference as they moved to the WAC on July 1, 2012.

Media
All Bobcats games air on KTSW. Video streaming of all Texas State Bobcats home games can be watched online at http://www.txstatebobcats.com/showcase.

Roster

Schedule and results
Source
All times are Central

|-
!colspan=9 style=| Regular season

References

Texas State Bobcats men's basketball seasons
Texas State
Texas State Bobcats basketball
Texas State Bobcats basketball